Dörtağaç can refer to:

 Dörtağaç, Bitlis
 Dörtağaç, Seyhan